De Vocht is a surname. Notable people with the surname include:

 Hendrik De Vocht (1878–1962), Belgian academic
 Liesbet De Vocht (born 1979), Belgian cyclist
 Wim De Vocht (born 1982), Belgian cyclist